Cheats is a 7-piece Filipino indie rock band. The band was first formed by Jim Bacarro in 2013, and features Bacarro on vocals, keys, and guitar, Saab Magalona and Candy Gamos on vocals, Manny Tanglao on bass, Jason Caballa and Kyle Quismundo on guitars, and Enzo Hermosa on drums. Cheats' eponymous debut album was released in July 2015.

Originally signed under independent label LockedDown Entertainment and later under Ely Buendia's Offshore Music, the band has been recently signed under MCA Music thru sublabel Island Records Philippines.

Discography

Studio albums
Cheats (2016)
Before the Babies (2017)
Houseplants (2022)

Singles
Newspaper Girl
Accidents
Drunk
Ringer
Crumble
Talk
Hakbang

References

Filipino rock music groups